The Thunder Bay Community Auditorium is a 1,511 seat performance arts centre, located in Thunder Bay, Ontario. It opened on October 16, 1985 and is home to the Thunder Bay Symphony Orchestra. The Community Auditorium hosts 150,000 patrons annually,.

It has a 40' by 50' permanent stage, a 70' by 39' proscenium, 8 dressing rooms, 52 lines, 2x 400 A 120 V/208 V electrical, 3 meeting rooms, a 450-person banquet capacity, and parking for 1000 vehicles. The facility features a wide variety of state-of-the-art equipment, including a ceiling that can be lowered or raised and acoustic draperies which can be adjusted to modify the reverberance in the auditorium.

Naming sponsor
In an effort to decrease the facility's burden on taxpayers, the Community Auditorium issued an expression of interest for an organization or individual to become a naming sponsor in February 2008. Two potential sponsors — Shaw Communications and TBayTel — initially expressed interest, but did not follow up on it by the March 27, 2008 deadline, and the name will remain the same. The facility receives $475,000 annually from the City of Thunder Bay.

References

External links
Thunder Bay Community Auditorium website

Culture of Thunder Bay
Buildings and structures in Thunder Bay
Music venues in Ontario
Tourist attractions in Thunder Bay District